Mouna Chebbah (born 8 July 1982) is a Tunisian handballer for Kastamonu and the Tunisian national team. 

She was also a member of Danish club Viborg HK from 1 July 2010 until June 2014. In the summer of 2016 she signed with French handball club Chambray Touraine Handball.

Career

National team
She participated in the 2009 World Championship in China, where Tunisia placed 14th, and Chebbah was among the top ten goalscorers.

Chebbah played the final of the 2010 Africa Nations Championship, where Tunisia lost against Angola. She was voted best player of the tournament.

In 2011 she participated in the 2011 World Women's Handball Championship in Brazil, where the Tunisian team placed 18th. At the 2012 African Women's Handball Championship in Morocco, where Tunisia placed second behind Angola, Chebbah was selected to the All-Tournament Team, and was voted best player of the championship. She participated at the 2013 World Women's Handball Championship in Serbia, where Tunisia placed 17th.

At the 2014 African Women's Handball Championship, she won a gold medal with the Tunisian team, which defeated DR Congo in the final.

At the 2015 World Women's Handball Championship in Denmark, Chebbah was among the top ten goal scorers, while Tunisia placed 21st in the championship.

Club career

Mouna Chebbah played three seasons for French club Besançon before transferring to Team Esbjerg of the Danish league. During her two years with Esbjerg, she was chosen Best Player of the Season twice. She was also voted best playmaker of the league and was part of the All Star Team for the 2009/10 season.

In May 2010 Chebbah signed a three-year contract with Viborg HK.

References

1982 births
Living people
Tunisian female handball players
Viborg HK players
People from Mahdia
Expatriate handball players
Tunisian expatriates in France